Barry Wilson may refer to:

 Barry Wilson (American football) (born 1943), American football coach
 Barry Wilson (artist) (born 1952), Haisla artist
 Barry Wilson (footballer) (born 1972), Scottish footballer
 Barry Wilson (Royal Navy officer) (1936–2018), British Navy officer, first captain of HMS Cardiff
 Barry Wilson (rugby league), Papua New Guinean rugby league coach

See also
Barrie Wilson, Canadian historian
 B. J. Wilson (1947–1990), English rock drummer